Winfield is a city in Lincoln County, Missouri, United States. The population was 1,404 at the 2010 census.

History
Winfield was laid out in 1879, and named after Winfield Scott Killam, the original owner of the town site. A post office called Winfield has been in operation since 1880.

On June 18, 2008, floodwaters opened a 150-foot breach in a primary levee along the Mississippi River in Winfield. The breach allowed floodwaters to claim dozens of homes and large tracts of farmland and put pressure on a secondary levee. The breach also prompted Lincoln County emergency officials to order the evacuation of residents east of Winfield. Press reports noted that some evacuees were being housed at the local high school.

On April 9, 2009, Winfield made news  after it elected their popular mayor, Harry Stonebraker, to a fourth term, several weeks after he died of a heart attack. This was because ballot papers had already been printed and absentee voting had begun. He won by a landslide, securing 90% of the vote by April 9.

Winfield appointed a temporary mayor to serve until a special election was held in April 2010.

Geography
Winfield is located at  (38.996469, -90.739898).

Demographics

2010 census
At the 2010 census there were 1,404 people, 525 households, and 360 families living in the city. The racial makup of the city was 97.0% White, 0.4% African American, 0.3% Asian, 0.1% Pacific Islander, 0.9% from other races, and 1.3% from two or more races. Hispanic or Latino of any race were 1.3%.

Of the 525 households 43.2% had children under the age of 18 living with them, 47.0% were married couples living together, 16.2% had a female householder with no husband present, 5.3% had a male householder with no wife present, and 31.4% were non-families. 24.6% of households were one person and 7.6% were one person aged 65 or older. The average household size was 2.61 and the average family size was 3.10.

The median age was 31 years. 28.4% of residents were under the age of 18; 8.8% were between the ages of 18 and 24; 33.8% were from 25 to 44; 20.4% were from 45 to 64; and 8.5% were 65 or older. The gender makeup of the city was 49.9% male and 50.1% female.

2000 census
At the 2000 census there were 723 people, 293 households, and 183 families living in the city. The racial makup of the city was 98.62% White, 0.14% African American, 0.28% Native American, 0.41% Asian, and 0.55% from two or more races. Hispanic or Latino of any race were 0.28%.

Of the 293 households 34.1% had children under the age of 18 living with them, 39.2% were married couples living together, 17.7% had a female householder with no husband present, and 37.5% were non-families. 30.7% of households were one person and 10.2% were one person aged 65 or older. The average household size was 2.42 and the average family size was 3.01.

The age distribution was 28.1% under the age of 18, 11.8% from 18 to 24, 29.6% from 25 to 44, 17.4% from 45 to 64, and 13.1% 65 or older. The median age was 33 years. For every 100 females, there were 90.8 males. For every 100 females age 18 and over, there were 88.4 males.

The median household income was $36,167 and the median family income  was $45,536. Males had a median income of $35,313 versus $21,071 for females. The per capita income for the city was $17,740. About 10.0% of families and 15.8% of the population were below the poverty line, including 19.0% of those under age 18 and 13.5% of those age 65 or over.

Education
Winfield, served by Winfield R-IV School District, has four different schools:
 Primary School (K-2)
 Intermediate School (3-5)
 Middle School (6-8)
 High School (9-12)

References

External links

Cities in Lincoln County, Missouri
Cities in Missouri